The karate competition at the 2013 World Games held in Cali, Colombia took place from July 26 to July 27.

Participating nations

Medalists

Medals table

References

External links 
 Results book

 
2013 World Games
2013
World Games